Foots Creek is an unincorporated community and census-designated place (CDP) in Jackson County, in the U.S. state of Oregon. It lies along Oregon Route 99 near the mouth of Foots Creek, where it empties into the Rogue River. Interstate 5 and Valley of the Rogue State Park are on the side of the river opposite Foots Creek.

For statistical purposes, the United States Census Bureau has defined Foots Creek as a census-designated place (CDP). The census definition of the area may not precisely correspond to local understanding of the area with the same name. As of the 2010 Census, the population was 799.

The community "has been known as 'Bolt' since pioneer days." The stream takes its name from O. G. Foot, a miner who prospected along the stream in the 19th century. A post office named Foots Creek had a brief existence in this vicinity in 1878–79. Silas Draper was the postmaster.

Demographics

References

Census-designated places in Oregon
Census-designated places in Jackson County, Oregon
Unincorporated communities in Jackson County, Oregon
Unincorporated communities in Oregon